Juan Salazar may refer to:
 Juan Francisco Salazar, Chilean anthropologist and filmmaker
 Juan Carlos Salazar (musician), Venezuelan singer and cuatro player
 Juan Carlos Salazar Gómez, secretary-general of the International Civil Aviation Organization
 Juan Camilo Salazar (footballer, born 1997), Colombian defender
 Juan Camilo Salazar (footballer, born 1998), Colombian forward
 Juan José Salazar, Colombian musician, sound engineer and music producer